George "Sam" Albert Shepperson  (7 January 1922 – 2 April 2020) was a British historian and Africanist, noted particularly for his work on Malawian and African-American history. He was William Robertson Professor of Commonwealth and American History at the University of Edinburgh from 1963 until 1986.  He was named Commander of the Order of the British Empire in 1989.

Early life and career 
George "Sam" Shepperson was born in Peterborough, Northamptonshire in 1922, the son of a fitter. He was educated at the King’s School, Peterborough, and read History and English at St John's College, Cambridge. He completed his Certificate of Education after his war service. He was commissioned in the Northamptonshire Regiment in 1943, and was on secondment to the King's African Rifles from 1943 to 1946 as an officer in the 13th (Nyasaland) Battalion, stationed in Kenya, Tanganyika, Ceylon, India and Burma. While stationed in East Africa he developed his interest in British imperial history and Africa. He began work teaching Imperial and American History at the University of Edinburgh in 1948 and was appointed to the William Robertson Chair in 1963, and retired in 1986. He had been a Visiting Professor at Roosevelt University and the University of Chicago, Rhode Island College, what is now Makerere University and Dalhousie University. He was awarded an honorary doctorate from the University of York in 1987 and was a visiting scholar at Harvard University 1986–87. In 1990 he was named a Fellow of the Educational Institute of Scotland.

Shepperson was a pathbreaking historian of the African Diaspora, the history of the African peoples and their spread across the world and was awarded the 'Distinguished Africanist' award in 2007 from the African Studies Association of the United Kingdom.  His research specialism was Malawian history, but he also wrote on African-American history (and was chair of the British Association for American Studies from 1971–74) and black British history (particularly relating to the black presence in Scotland.  Many of his writings, including on John Chilembwe and the Chilembwe uprising, are seen as seminal contributions. Independent African: John Chilembwe and the Origins, Setting and Significance of the Nyasaland Native Rising 1915 (1958) was one of the first scholarly works on African history and was widely read by African nationalists after its publication. Shepperson provided an account of his life as an Africanist historian as a contribution to The Emergence of African History at British Universities: An Autobiographical Approach (1995, edited by Anthony Kirk-Greene).

He was awarded the CBE in 1989 as chairman of the Scottish Committee of the Commonwealth Institute.

Selected publications

'Education sponsors freedom—the story of African native John Chilembwe' Negro history bulletin, v. 15, Jan. 1952.
'Ethiopianism and African nationalism'. Phylon, v. 14, (1953)
'Frederick Douglass and Scotland', The Journal of African American History, 38, 3 (1953).
Independent African: John Chilembwe and the Origins, Setting and Significance of the Nyasaland Native Rising 1915 (with Thomas Price) (1958, 5th edition 1987)
'Notes on Negro American Influences on the Emergence of African Nationalism', The Journal of African History, 1, 2 (1960).
'External factors in the development of African nationalism, with particular reference to British Central Africa'. Phylon, v. 22 (1961)
'Pan-Africanism and "Pan-Africanism": Some Historical Notes', Phylon, 23, No. 4 (1962).
'The Negro and the New Frontier', The Political Quarterly, 33, 2 (1962).
'Abolitionism and African Political Thought', Transition 12 (1964).
David Livingstone and the Rovuma: A notebook edited with introduction and related documents (1965).
'The African diaspora: or Africa abroad', African Forum, 2 (1966)
Myth and reality in Malawi (1966)
West African Countries and Peoples by Africanus Horton (editor) (1969)
'Introduction' to The Negro by W.E.B. Du Bois (1970)
'Mungo Park and the Scottish Contribution to Africa', African Affairs, 70, (1971)
Joseph Booth and the African Diaspora (1972)
'Kipling and the Boer War' in John Goss (ed.) Kipling: The man, his work and his world (1972)
Scotland, Europe, and the American Revolution (co-edited with Owen Dudley Edwards) (1976)
'America through Africa and Asia', Journal of American Studies,  Vol. 14, No. 1, BAAS Jubilee Issue (Apr., 1980).
'The Fifth Pan-African Conference, 1945 and the All African Peoples Congress, 1958,'(with St. Clare Drake), Contributions in Black Studies, 8,  5 (1986)
'Malawi and the Poetry of Two World Wars,' The Society of Malawi Journal, 43, 2 (1990).
'African Diaspora: Concept and Context' in Global Dimensions of the African Diaspora, edited by Joseph E. Harris (1993).
'Paul Robeson in Edinburgh'. University of Edinburgh Journal. 37-38 (1998).
'Memories of Dr Banda', The Society of Malawi Journal 51, 1 (1998).
'Degree Award Oration', The Society of Malawi Journal, 56, 1 (2003).
'Islam in Central Africa: A Historiographical Document', The Society of Malawi Journal, 59, 2 (2006).
'A Major Chilembwe Letter', The Society of Malawi Journal, 68, 1 (2015).
'Dr John McCracken: A personal tribute', The Society of Malawi Journal, 71, 1 (2018).

References

Further reading
 Angus Calder, 'The Making of Schwarzer Orpheus: Janheinz Jahn and George Shepperson', Journal of Commonwealth Literature (1980).
Cedric Robinson, 'Notes toward a "Native" Theory of History', Review (Fernand Braudel Center) 4, 1 (1980).
'Ourselves as Others: Some Comments on Cedric Robinson on George Shepperson', Review (Fernand Braudel Center) 4, 1 (1980).

External links
Interview at the Archives of the Imperial War Museum
Shepperson's opening address at the "Chilembwe Revisited Symposium" (University of Edinburgh, 7 February 2015)
Profile at Edinburgh University Library

1922 births
2020 deaths
Military personnel from Northamptonshire
People educated at The King's School, Peterborough
Alumni of St John's College, Cambridge
Academics of the University of Edinburgh
People from Peterborough
English Africanists
Northamptonshire Regiment officers
King's African Rifles officers
English historians
Historians of Malawi
Commanders of the Order of the British Empire
Historians of African Americans
Historians of the British Empire
Roosevelt University faculty
Rhode Island College faculty
University of Chicago faculty
Academic staff of Makerere University
Academic staff of the Dalhousie University